Amoret may refer to:

 Amoret, Missouri, a city in the Kansas City metropolitan area
 Amoret Whitaker, British forensic entomologist
 Amoret, a character in Edmund Spenser's 1590 poem The Faerie Queene
 Amoret, a character in John Fletcher's 1608 play The Faithful Shepherdess

See also 
 The Amorettes, a Scottish hard rock band
 Amorette Wild (born 1989), Australian netball player 
 Amore (disambiguation)